Alexandru Gheorghe Forminte (born 19 September 1982 in Piatra Neamţ) is a Romanian former football player. He played as a centre back.

External links
 
 
 

1982 births
Living people
Sportspeople from Piatra Neamț
Romanian footballers
Association football defenders
Liga I players
Liga II players
CSM Ceahlăul Piatra Neamț players
FCM Dunărea Galați players